Wolgok station 월곡역 is a closed station on the Gyeongchun Line in South Korea.

Defunct railway stations in South Korea